The 1913 Cincinnati Reds season was a season in American baseball. The team finished seventh in the National League with a record of 64–89,  games behind the New York Giants.

Off-season 
On December 15, the Reds and Chicago Cubs were involved in an eight-player trade.  Cincinnati sent Red Corriden, whom the team just acquired four days earlier from the Detroit Tigers for $7500, Bert Humphries, Pete Knisely, Mike Mitchell and Art Phelan to the Cubs for Joe Tinker, Grover Lowdermilk, and Harry Chapman.

Tinker was named as manager of the team after the trade, as he would take over as player-manager, replacing Hank O'Day.  Tinker played with the Cubs since 1901, and helped them win the World Series in 1907 and 1908.  Tinker was coming off a great season in 1912, as he hit .282 and earned a career-high 77 RBI.  He finished fourth in National League MVP voting.

On January 1, the club sold catcher Larry McLean to the St. Louis Cardinals.  Two days later, Cincinnati acquired Mordecai Brown from the Louisville Colonels of the American Association for Grover Lowdermilk.

Regular season 
Tinker ended up missing several weeks of the regular season when he gave blood for his wife's blood transfusion.  He hit a career-high .317, along with one home run and 57 RBI in 110 games.  He also played great defense at shortstop, setting a career high in fielding percentage at .968.

Early in the season, Cincinnati traded away Harry Chapman and Tex McDonald to the Boston Braves for veteran catcher Johnny Kling.  Kling played with Tinker on the Chicago Cubs from 1901 to 1911.

On May 23, the Reds traded struggling pitcher Art Fromme to the New York Giants, receiving pitcher Red Ames, outfielder Josh Devore, second baseman Heinie Groh and $20,000.  Ames, an eleven-year veteran, had a 108–77 record and a 2.45 ERA with the Giants, and helped New York win the 1905 World Series.

Chief Johnson emerged as the ace of the pitching staff in his rookie season, going 14–16 with a 3.01 ERA in 44 games.  Johnson led the team with 269 innings pitched, 13 complete games and 107 strikeouts. Ames led the Reds with a 2.88 ERA, posting a record of 11–12 and pitching 187.1 innings after his mid-season trade from the New York Giants. The Reds pitching staff struggled, as their team ERA of 3.46 was seventh in the National League.

Season summary 
The Reds got off to a very poor start in 1913, going 4–16 in their first twenty games, sitting in last place.  The club remained in last place until the end of July, as on July 29, they passed the St. Louis Cardinals in the standings after a win over the Brooklyn Superbas to improve their record to 36-59.  Cincinnati would finish the season in seventh place with a 64-89 record.  Their .418 winning percentage was their lowest since 1901.  The Reds finished 37.5 games behind the first-place New York Giants.

Season standings

Record vs. opponents

Roster

Player stats

Batting

Starters by position 
Note: Pos = Position; G = Games played; AB = At bats; H = Hits; Avg. = Batting average; HR = Home runs; RBI = Runs batted in

Other batters 
Note: G = Games played; AB = At bats; H = Hits; Avg. = Batting average; HR = Home runs; RBI = Runs batted in

Pitching

Starting pitchers 
Note: G = Games pitched; IP = Innings pitched; W = Wins; L = Losses; ERA = Earned run average; SO = Strikeouts

Other pitchers 
Note: G = Games pitched; IP = Innings pitched; W = Wins; L = Losses; ERA = Earned run average; SO = Strikeouts

Relief pitchers 
Note: G = Games pitched; W = Wins; L = Losses; SV = Saves; ERA = Earned run average; SO = Strikeouts

Notes

References 
 1913 Cincinnati Reds season at Baseball Reference

Cincinnati Reds seasons
Cincinnati Reds season
Cincinnati Reds